The Mexican red shiner (Cyprinella rutila) is a species of fish in the family Cyprinidae. It is endemic to Mexico.

References

Cyprinella
Taxa named by Charles Frédéric Girard
Fish described in 1856